Anthony W. Knapp (born 2 December 1941, Morristown, New Jersey) is an American mathematician at the State University of New York, Stony Brook working on representation theory, who classified the tempered representations of a semisimple Lie group.

He won the Leroy P. Steele Prize for Mathematical Exposition in 1997. In 2012 he became a fellow of the American Mathematical Society.

Selected publications
 (Book review)
 (Book review)
Elliptic curves. – Princeton, 1992 (Mathematical notes; 40)  Zbl.0804.14013
Representation theory of semisimple groups : An overview based on examples,  (Originally publ. 1986) Princeton: University Press, 2001. (Princeton Landmarks in Mathematics) .
 Lie Groups: Beyond an Introduction, (Originally publ. 1996) Second Edition, Progress in Mathematics, Vol. 140, Birkhäuser, Boston, 2002. .
(with David A. Vogan)  Cohomological Induction and Unitary Representations, Princeton Mathematical Series 45, Princeton University Press, Princeton, New Jersey, 1995.
(with Gregg Zuckerman)    Classification of irreducible tempered representations of semisimple Lie groups Proceedings of the National Academy of Sciences of the United States of America 73, No. 7 (Jul. 1976), pp. 2178–2180
(with Gregg Zuckerman)  "Classification of irreducible tempered representations of semisimple groups" Annals of Mathematics 116 (1982) 389–501,  correction 119 (1984) 639.

References

External links

Home page of Anthony Knapp, which also hosts access to free books by the author under specific use- and copyrights.

Living people
20th-century American mathematicians
21st-century American mathematicians
Princeton University alumni
People from Morristown, New Jersey
State University of New York faculty
Fellows of the American Mathematical Society
1941 births
Mathematicians from New Jersey